Delamare or De la Mare is a surname of Norman origin. Delamare may refer to:

Achille Joseph Delamare (1790-1873), French senator.
Sir Arthur de la Mare (1914–1994), British diplomat
Delphine Delamare (née Couturier, 1822–1848), French housewife said to have inspired Flaubert's Madame Bovary
Frederick Archibald de la Mare (1877–1960), New Zealand lawyer and educationalist
Sir John Delamare (c.1320–1383), courtier of Edward III of England and builder of Nunney Castle in Somerset
Júlio Delamare (1928-1973), Brazilian sports journalist
Lise Delamare (1913–2006), French stage and film actress
Manuel De La Mare (born 1979), Italian music producer and recording artist
Marisa Delamare, character in His Dark Materials
Marcel Delamare, character in The Secret Commonwealth
Sir Peter de la Mare (died c.1387), English politician during the Good Parliament of 1376
Philip DeLaMare (1823–1915), American Mormon who started a sugar factory in Utah
Rosine Delamare (1911–2013), French costume designer
Walter de la Mare (1873–1956), English writer
William de la Mare (died c.1285), English Franciscan theologian
Xavier Delamare, French former Scientology leader

See also
Delamere (disambiguation)
Delamarre
Baron Delamare
:fr:Delamare Bois, French timber company established in 1690
Delamare-Deboutteville, French car designed in 1884
Kornblum–DeLaMare rearrangement, rearrangement reaction in organic chemistry

French-language surnames

References